This is a list of current cigarette brands.  Factory-made cigarettes, when contrasted to roll-your-own cigarettes, are called tailor mades.

List

See also
 List of electronic cigarette and e-cigarette liquid brands

References

External links
 

!
cigarette brands